Terry is a surname which comes from the medieval Norman given name Thierry, cognate of the English Derek. Notable people with the surname include:
 Adam Terry, American football player
 Alfred Terry, American Civil War Union general
 Ben Terry, Test cricket umpire
 Benjamin Franklin Terry, organizer of the American Civil War unit Terry's Texas Rangers
 Bill Terry, American major league baseball player
 Charles L. Terry, Jr. (1900–1970), American judge and politician, Governor of Delaware
 Charles Sanford Terry (historian) (1864–1936), English historian and musicologist
 Charles Sanford Terry (translator), American translator of Japanese literature
 Clark Terry, jazz fluegelhorn/trumpet player and music educator
 Dalen Terry (born 2002), American basketball player
 Daniel Terry (c. 1780–1829), English actor and playwright
 Desean Terry, American actor, acting coach and theatre director
 Edward Terry (author) (1590-1660), cleric and author of A Voyage to East-India (1655)
 Edward O'Connor Terry, 19th-century English actor and theatre owner
 Edward Richard "Ted" Terry (1904–1967), Tasmanian professional sprinter and Australian rules footballer
 Eli Terry (1772–1852), American inventor and clockmaker
 Elizabeth Terry, American chef
 Dame Ellen Terry (1847–1928), English actress
 Fred Terry (1863–1933), English actor and theatre manager
 Georgena Terry, American bicycle designer and businesswoman 
 Georgina Terry, British actress
 Harry Terry (born 1887), English stage and film actor
 Helen Terry, backing vocals singer with British pop group Culture Club
 Henry Dwight Terry (1812–1869), United States Army Brigadier general during the American Civil War
 Henry John Terry (1869–1952), cricketer who played for the French team in the 1900 Olympics
 J. E. Harold Terry (1885–1939), English playwright
 Jack Terry (1930–2022), Polish-American author
 James Terry (basketball) (born 1960), American-Israeli basketball player
 James L. Terry, US Army Lieutenant General
 Jason Terry, American basketball player
 Jo Ann Terry, American hurdler
 John B. Terry (1796-1874), American pioneer, soldier, and territorial legislator
 John Terry (born 1980), English football player
 Joseph Terry (1828-1898), partner in Terry's chocolate makers (1767–2006)
 Luther Leonidas Terry (1911–1985), U.S. Surgeon General (1961–65)
 Matt Terry (born 1993), English singer, winner of UK X Factor (2016)
 Michael Terry (disambiguation)
 Nigel Terry (1945–2015), English actor
 Olufemi Terry, Sierra Leonean writer
 P. S. Terry, American politician, Missouri senator
 Pat Terry, English footballer
 Paul Terry (cricketer) (born 1959), English cricketer
 Paul Terry (footballer), English footballer and brother of John
 Paul Terry (cartoonist), U.S. cartoonist and animator, and creator of Terrytoons
 Peter Terry, British air marshal
 Ralph Terry, American major league baseball pitcher
 Richard Terry (musicologist), Sir Richard Runciman Terry, organist, choir director and musicologist
 Rob Terry, American professional wrestler
 Ruth Terry (1920–2016), American actress
 Samuel Terry (c. 1776–1838), Australian landowner, merchant and philanthropist
 Sean Terry (born 1991), English cricketer
 Simon Terry, British archer
 Sue Mi Terry, American writer and commentator
 Tamorrion Terry (born 1998), American football player
 Todd Terry, American DJ, record producer and remixer
 Tomás Terry (died 1886), Cuban slave trader and businessman
 Troy Terry (born 1997), American ice hockey player
 Tyrell Terry (born 2000), American basketball player
 T. T. Terry, American politician; mayor of Huntsville, Alabama
 Victor Terry, English murderer 
 Wallace Terry (1938–2003), American journalist and oral historian
 Wallace Terry (baseball) (1850–1908), American  baseball player
 Walter Terry, American politician
 William Terry (congressman), American  general
 William R. Terry (1827–1897), American  general

See also
 Terry (given name)
 Terry (disambiguation)

English-language surnames